Janet Spens (1876–1963) was a Scottish literary scholar specialising in Elizabethan literature. She was the assistant to Regius Professor Macneile Dixon in the Department of English Language and Literature (1908 to 1911) and "tutor to the women students in Arts" (1909 to 1911) at the University of Glasgow, before joining Lady Margaret Hall, Oxford as a fellow and tutor in English (1911 to 1936). In 1910, she became the first woman to be awarded a Doctor of Letters (DLitt) degree by the University of Glasgow.

Selected works

References

External links

1876 births
1963 deaths
Scottish literary critics
Scottish women literary critics
Academics of the University of Glasgow
First women admitted to degrees at Oxford
Fellows of Lady Margaret Hall, Oxford
People from Hamilton, South Lanarkshire
Alumni of the University of Glasgow